Kucsó may refer to:

 Cuceu, a village near Jibou, a town in Sălaj County, Transylvania, Romania
 Kučevo, a toponym in Serbia